Eva Marečková (born 18 May 1964) is a Slovak gymnast. She competed in six events at the 1980 Summer Olympics.

References

1964 births
Living people
Slovak female artistic gymnasts
Olympic gymnasts of Czechoslovakia
Gymnasts at the 1980 Summer Olympics
People from Detva District
Sportspeople from the Banská Bystrica Region